The Pentagon Shopping Centre (known locally as 'The Pentagon') is a shopping centre in Chatham in Kent. The centre's name derives from the fact that its main courtyard is five-sided. The shopping centre is located next to the Waterfront bus station which replaces the Pentagon bus station, which 80% of services use. The shopping centre contains over 70 shops and 7 leisure facilities, many high street names in fashion, homeware and food stores. There are also cafes, restaurants and a bowling alley. As is common with some other 1970's era town centre shopping centres, The Pentagon does not feature a food court or any dedicated dining area. Instead, there are various food outlets scattered throughout the centre. Built as part of the redevelopment of Chatham town centre in the 1970s, the Pentagon also features the high rise Mountbatten House office block, which has controversially stood empty or part-used for most of its history. The Pentagon, Mountbatten House and the Brook multi-storey carpark are built in a distinctive orange-red brick with grey concrete.

Stores
As of April 2019 businesses located in the Pentagon include: 
BB's Coffee & Muffins, Boots, British Heart Foundation Clothing & Electrical store, Card Factory, CeX (formerly in the High Street), DW Sports, 1st Bowl (Bowling Alley), Greggs, New Look, Poundland, Sainsbury's, Subway, Superdrug and Wilko.

The long-established WHSmith store closed on 15 April 2015 following expiry of their unit's lease. The centre also features a taxi rank and public toilets (these formerly charged a fee for entry of 20p).

Information
The shopping centre is spread over two floors, with lifts and two escalators located in the Pentagon Court connecting the two floors. Wilkinson occupies one of the largest units, with access on both levels. New Look also has a two-level unit, accessible from the ground floor. The former WH Smith unit used to occupy two floors, but downsized to ground-floor only in the mid-2000s. Boots also downsized its store over the years, with part of its store now used as an NHS surgery.

History
The Pentagon was built in the early 1970s, over the demolished George Street, Nelson Road, Fair Row, Solomons Road and Avondale Terrace. The book printer Mackays of Chatham had premises between the High Street, and the Brook car park. The entrance to their facility was in Fair Row. The Factory was made up of a new build and a nineteenth century candle factory. Mackays eventually relocated to Lordswood, South of Chatham, where they still are.

Past tenants and features
Major retailers that have had units in The Pentagon in the past include C & A, Co-op Department Store, Wimpy, Bejams, Dolcis, Ravel, Saxon Shoes and Birthdays as well as many independent, smaller retailers such as Snobs, Jones the Newsagents and John Menzies. There were also two adult evening venues – The Blue Grotto Wine Bar (in the late 70's) (situated by the public toilets, taxi rank and exit to Mountbatten House)  which is now a dry cleaners, and Scamps (later Van Damme) Night Club, which is now the bowling alley. This nightclub developed a particularly rough reputation in its later years. The centre was re-modelled in the late 1990s, removing many of the (by then) dated 1970s features. The fountain and seating were removed, along with an old-style escalator to the side of Sainsbury's, a staircase by C&A (now Wilkinsons) and a sloped walkway for wheelchair access to the upper level. In their place, modern glass lifts and escalators were installed, along with new ceilings and lighting, giving the centre a much brighter atmosphere. The original flooring is still in place throughout much of the centre. When the centre first opened there were also children's play areas featuring a wooden snake, snail and whale - these were made of wood and metal and designed to be climbing frames or in the case of the snake a crawling frame. The play area was located opposite the existing Poundland store.

Future
Owing to the various alterations going ahead in Chatham town centre and to the new bus interchange facility in Globe Lane, the Pentagon is planned to be re-developed as well. The space taken up by the former bus station is planned to be taken up by expanded retail capacity and residential apartments. A large food store, major space units and more leisure facilities are also part of the plans. As of 2018, the plans have yet to be financed, or put into motion.

The Pentagon (and the rest of Chatham town centre) have suffered from external factors, such as the construction of Bluewater and Lakeside, two of the country's largest modern shopping centres, fairly close by.

References

External links

 Official Website

Shopping centres in Kent
Chatham, Kent